Burmezomus is a genus of hubbardiid short-tailed whipscorpions, first described by D. B. Bastawade in 2004.

Species 
, the World Schizomida Catalog accepts the following two species:

 Burmezomus cavernicola (Gravely, 1912) – Myanmar
 Burmezomus chaibassicus (Bastawade, 2002) – India

References 

Schizomida genera